The Samsung NX11 is a DSLR-styled mirrorless camera announced by Samsung on December 28, 2010. It introduces the i-Function feature to the NX10 lineage, and has a redesigned grip.

References
http://www.dpreview.com/products/samsung/slrs/samsung_nx11/specifications

Live-preview digital cameras
NX11
Cameras introduced in 2010